Semarang Tawang Station (SMT) is a large class type A railway station in Tanjung Mas, North Semarang, Semarang, Central Java, Indonesia. The station which is located at an altitude +2 m is included in Operational Area IV Semarang and the largest station in Semarang and North Central Java. The station is the oldest major railway station in Indonesia after  Station and opened on 19 July 1868 on the Semarang Tawang–Tanggung railway. All trains that go through the North Java line stop at this station except Jayabaya, Kertajaya, and cargo trains. 

Because of the rapid development and improper city planning of the coastal city of Semarang, Tawang station is frequently flooded by heavy rainfall, rising sea levels, and the loss of catchment areas north of the station. This impacts railway operations on northern railway connections.

Services 
The following is a list of train services at the Semarang Tawang Station

Passenger services

Executive class 
 Argo Muria from and to 
 Argo Sindoro from and to 

Mixed class 
 Ciremai from and to  via  (executive-business)
 Kamandaka from and to  via  (executive-economy plus)
 Joglosemarkerto, looping trains in Central Java and The Special Region of Yogyakarta (executive-economy plus class) to:
  continued –Semarang Tawang via –
  continued

Premium Economy class 

Economy Plus class 
 Menoreh from and to

Economy class 

Local/Commuter train 

References

External links
 
  PT KAI - the Indonesian rail company
  Forum Semboyan35 - Indonesian Rail fans Forum

Buildings and structures in Semarang
Railway stations in Central Java
Railway stations opened in 1914